Mashantucket is a census-designated place (CDP) in the northeast part of the town of Ledyard, New London County, Connecticut, United States. It consists of land held by the Mashantucket Pequot Tribe. The Foxwoods Resort Casino is in the northeast part of the CDP, along Connecticut Route 2. As of the 2010 census, the CDP had a population of 299.

References 

Census-designated places in New London County, Connecticut
Census-designated places in Connecticut